Mursa phtisialis, the mallow mursa moth, is a moth of the family Erebidae. The species was first described by Achille Guenée in 1854. It is found on Cuba, the southern parts of the United States, Jamaica, Central and South America.

The larvae feed on Malva acuta.

References

Moths described in 1965
Boletobiinae
Moths of North America
Moths of South America